Julu is a county of Xingtai City, in the south of Hebei province, China. Prior to the Sui Dynasty, Julu had been known as Nanyi County. The name was changed and became Julu, with the Chinese for Ju being written either as either "" or "". In 1980, the name was standardized as "".

Administrative divisions
The county administers 6 towns and 4 townships.

Towns:
Julu, Wanghuzhai, Xiguocheng, Guanting, Yantuan, Xiaolüzhai

Townships:
Ticun Township, Zhangwangtuan Township, Guanzhai Township, Sujiaying Township

Climate

References

External links
http://www.0319xt.cn/renwen/xiangxi.asp?id=272

County-level divisions of Hebei
Xingtai